The 2011–12 Boise State Broncos men's basketball team represented Boise State University during the 2011–12 NCAA Division I men's basketball season. The Broncos, led by second-year head coach Leon Rice, played their home games at Taco Bell Arena and were first-year members of the Mountain West Conference. They finished the season 13–17, 3–11 in Mountain West play, to finish in a tie for last place. They lost in the quarterfinals of the Mountain West Basketball tournament to San Diego State.

Roster

Schedule

|-
!colspan=9| Exhibition

|-
!colspan=9| Regular season

|-
!colspan=9| 2012 Mountain West Conference men's basketball tournament

References

Boise State Broncos men's basketball seasons
Boise State
Boise
Boise